Karakanakadal is a 1971 Indian Malayalam-language film, directed by K. S. Sethumadhavan and produced by Hari Pothan. The film stars Sathyan, Madhu, Jayabharathi, Vincent, Sankaradi and Kaviyoor Ponnamma. It is based on the novel of the same name by Muttathu Varkey. The film won the National Film Award for Best Feature Film in Malayalam.

Plot

Cast 

Sathyan as Thoma
Madhu as Kariya
Jayabharathi as Mary
Kaviyoor Ponnamma as Tharathi
Thikkurissy Sukumaran Nair as Muthalali
Sankaradi as Peelipochan
Shobha as Ammini (Child Artist)
T. R. Omana as Akkachedathi
Adoor Bhavani as Thoma's Mother
Adoor Pankajam as Maria
Alummoodan as Kunjaammoo
C. A. Balan as Pulayan Mathai
Kedamangalam Ali as Kollan Narayanan
Meena as Kunjeli
Murali as Mathaikkutty
Paravoor Bharathan as Ickochan
Vincent as Joy

Soundtrack 
The music is composed by G. Devarajan, with lyrics by Vayalar Ramavarma.

References

External links 
 

1970s Malayalam-language films
1971 films
Best Malayalam Feature Film National Film Award winners
Films based on Indian novels
Films directed by K. S. Sethumadhavan